Neogale is a genus of mustelid native to the Americas, ranging from Alaska south to Bolivia. Members of this genus are known as New World weasels.

Taxonomy 
Members of this genus were formerly classified into the genera Mustela and Neovison, but many studies had previously recovered several American species of Mustela, as well as both species within Neovison, to comprise a monophyletic clade distinct from all other members of Mustelinae. A 2021 study found this clade to have diverged from Mustela during the Late Miocene, between 11.8 - 13.4 million years ago, with all members within the clade being more closely related to one another than to any of the other species in Mustela, and gave it the name Neogale, originally coined by John Edward Gray. The American Society of Mammalogists later accepted this change.

Species
There are 5 recent species in the genus, 4 extant and 1 extinct:

Extant species

Extinct species

References

Mustelinae
Taxa named by John Edward Gray
Extant Miocene first appearances